Cuchilla (plural: cuchillas), Spanish for blade or hill covered by grasslands (in the Pampas of Uruguay and Argentina) may refer to:

 Cuchilla Alta, a seaside resort in Canelones in Montevideo in Uruguay
 Cuchilla de Caraguatá, a range of hills in Uruguay
 Cuchilla Grande Inferior, a hill range in Uruguay
 Cuchilla Grande, a hill range in Uruguay
 Cuchillas del Toa, a biosphere reserve in Cuba
 Cuchillas, Corozal, Puerto Rico, a barrio in Puerto Rico
 Cuchillas, Moca, Puerto Rico, a barrio in Puerto Rico
 Cuchillas, Morovis, Puerto Rico, a barrio in Puerto Rico